{{DISPLAYTITLE:5-HT1B receptor}}

5-hydroxytryptamine receptor 1B  also known as the 5-HT1B receptor is a protein that in humans is encoded by the HTR1B gene. The 5-HT1B receptor is a 5-HT receptor subtype.

Tissue distribution and function
5-HT1B receptors are widely distributed throughout the central nervous system with the highest concentrations found in the frontal cortex, basal ganglia, striatum, and the hippocampus.
The function of the 5-HT1B receptor differs depending upon its location.  In the frontal cortex, it is believed to act as a postsynaptic receptor inhibiting the release of dopamine.  In the basal ganglia and the striatum, evidence suggests 5-HT signaling acts on an autoreceptor, inhibiting the release of serotonin and decreasing glutamatergic transmission by reducing miniature excitatory postsynaptic potential (mEPSP) frequency, respectively.  In the hippocampus, a recent study has demonstrated that activation of postsynaptic 5-HT1B heteroreceptors produces a facilitation in excitatory synaptic transmission which is altered in depression.
When the expression of 5-HT1B in human cortex was traced throughout life, significant changes during adolescence were observed, in a way that is strongly correlated with the expression of 5-HT1E.

Outside of the CNS, the 5-HT1B receptor is also expressed on the endothelium of blood vessels, particularly in the meninges. Activation of these receptors results in vasoconstriction. The high distribution of vasoconstrictive 5-HT1B and 5-HT1D receptors around the brain makes them a valuable drug target for the treatment of migraines.

Blocking 5-HT1B receptor signalling also increases the number of osteoblasts, bone mass, and the bone formation rate.

Knockout mice lacking the 5-HT1B gene have been reported to have a higher preference for alcohol, although later studies failed to replicate such abnormalities in alcohol consumption. These mice have also been reported to have a lower measure of anxiety (such as on the elevated plus maze test) and a higher measure of aggression. 

Under basal conditions, knockout mice present with a "normal" phenotype and exhibit a sucrose preference (lack of sucrose preference is considered a measure of anhedonia). However, after undergoing chronic unpredictable stress treatment to induce a "depression-like" phenotype these animals do not benefit from administration of selective serotonin reuptake inhibitor (SSRIs).

Ligands

Agonists
 Ergotamine (vasoconstrictor in migraine)
 Oxymetazoline
 Sumatriptan (vasoconstrictor in migraine)
 Zolmitriptan
 5-Carboxamidotryptamine
 CGS-12066A
 CP-93,129 (peripherally acting)
 CP-94,253
 CP-122,288 (mixed 5-HT1B/1D agonist)
 CP-135,807 (mixed 5-HT1B/1D agonist)
 RU-24969 (mixed 5-HT1A/1B agonist)

Partial agonists
 Ziprasidone (antipsychotic)
 Asenapine (antipsychotic)
 Vortioxetine (antidepressant)

Antagonists and inverse agonists
 Methiothepin (antipsychotic)
 Yohimbine (aphrodisiac)
 Metergoline
 Aripiprazole 
 Isamoltane
 AR-A000002
 SB-216,641
 SB-224,289 (inverse agonist)
 SB-236,057 (inverse agonist)

Undetermined Action
 Dextromethorphan (Cough Suppressant)

Genetics 

In humans the protein is coded by the gene HTR1B.

A genetic variant in the promoter region, A-161T, has been examined with respect to personality traits and showed no major effect.

See also 
 5-HT1 receptor
 5-HT receptor

References

Further reading

External links 
 
 
 

Serotonin receptors
Biology of attention deficit hyperactivity disorder